Anton Köllisch (16 March 1888 – September 1916) was a German chemist who, whilst working at Darmstadt for pharmaceutical giant Merck, first described the synthesis of the chemical MDMA.

Life and work 
In 1911, Köllisch published his doctoral dissertation on the topic of indole synthesis from hydrazones under Otto Diels at the University of Berlin.

While at Merck, Dr Köllisch was involved in investigating syntheses for methylhydrastinine and hydrastinine. A procedural patent was filed on Christmas Eve 1912 relating to these syntheses, which mentioned MDMA without name as a chemical intermediate.

He was killed in the First World War.

References

Bibliography 
 Germany, Kaiserliches Patentamt, Patentschrift Nr 274350, http://mdma.net/merck/mdma-patent1.html

 Adam, David.  Truth about ecstasy's unlikely trip from lab to dance floor: Pharmaceutical company unravels drug's chequered past, Guardian Unlimited, 2006-08-18.
 

1888 births
20th-century German chemists
1916 deaths
German military personnel killed in World War I
Scientists from Darmstadt